Avatar Press is an independent American comic book publisher founded in 1996 by William A. Christensen, and based in Rantoul, Illinois. Avatar Press is most notable for publishing bad girl comics, such as Faust, Pandora, Hellina, Lookers, The Ravening, and Brian Pulido's Lady Death. Such comics are currently published under the "Boundless Comics" imprint.

Avatar has a strong web presence, anchored by Warren Ellis' FreakAngels webcomic, as well as the comics news site Bleeding Cool, helmed by Rich Johnston.

History

Publisher Christensen had been a freelance contributor to Wizard magazine before founding Avatar Press. The company initially published only limited series. Avatar subsequently expanded to other formats.

As part of an effort to expand beyond its reputation as a bad girl publisher, Avatar offered a number of noted creators an opportunity to publish creator-owned books with no content restrictions whatsoever. Among the creators to take Avatar up on its offer were Frank Miller, Warren Ellis, Alan Moore, and Garth Ennis.

The company has also licensed comic book adaptations of famous science-fiction and horror movies and television shows, such as RoboCop, Night of the Living Dead, and Friday the 13th.

Titles

By author 

 Jamie Delano:
 Narcopolis
 Rawbone
 Mike Deodato:
 Jade Warriors
 Warren Ellis:
 Aetheric Mechanics
 Anna Mercury
 Apparat
 Atmospherics
 Bad Signal
 Bad World
 Blackgas
 Black Summer
 Captain Swing and the Electrical Pirates of Cindery Island
 Crécy
 Dark Blue
 Doktor Sleepless
 Frankenstein's Womb
 FreakAngels
 Gravel
 Ilium
 Ignition City
 No Hero
 Scars
 Supergod
 Wolfskin
 Garth Ennis:
 303
 Chronicles of Wormwood
 Crossed
 Dicks
 Rover Red Charlie
 Stitched
 Streets of Glory
 Christos Gage:
 Absolution
 Kieron Gillen:
 The Heat
 Über
 Steven Grant:
 Mortal Souls
 My Flesh is Cool
 Jonathan Hickman:
 God Is Dead
 David Lapham:
 Caligula
 Dan the Unharmable
 Ferals
 Rob Liefeld:
 Avengelyne
 The Coven
 Glory
 Mark Millar:
 The Unfunnies
 Alan Moore:
 Another Suburban Romance
 Cinema Purgatorio
 The Courtyard
 The Courtyard Companion
 Fashion Beast
 Glory
 Hypothetical Lizard
 Light of Thy Countenance
 Magic Words
 Neonomicon
 Nightjar
 Providence
 A Small Killing
 Writing for Comics
 Yuggoth Cultures and Other Growths
 Zak Penn:
 Hero Worship
 Eric Powell:
 The Goon
 Brian Pulido:
 Belladonna
 Gypsy
 Lady Death (of Chaos Comics fame)
 Unholy
 War Angel
 John A. Russo:
 Escape of the Living Dead
 William Tucci:
 Shi
 Tim Vigil:
 777: The Wrath
 Cuda: An Age of Metal and Magic
 Faust/777: The Wrath (aka Darkness in Collision)
 Faust: Book of M
 Webwitch
 Mike Wolfer:
 Widow

Selected other titles 

 Pandora (Avatar's flagship character)
 Demonslayer by Marat Mychael
 Dreamwalker by Jenni Gregory
 Hellina
 Jungle Fantasy, starring Fauna from the Threshold series' "Fauna, Jungle Girl"
 Jungle Fantasy: Ivory, starring an independent cave-woman named Ivory who is a "widow" in search of her infant son who was abducted
 Lookers
 Medieval Lady Death
 Nira-X Cyberangel by Bill Maus
 The Ravening
Razor by Everette Hartsoe
 Rich Johnston's Holed Up by Rich Johnston
 Twilight, which, along with Twilight: Live Wire, was reprinted in Twilight: Raw

Adaptations and licensed properties

By author 
 Max Brooks:
 The Extinction Parade
 Joe R. Lansdale:
 By Bizarre Hands
 The Drive-in
 On the Far Side With Dead Folks
 George R. R. Martin:
 Fevre Dream
 The Skin Trade

Selected other titles 
 Frank Miller's RoboCop
 Friday the 13th
 George A. Romero's Night of the Living Dead
 A Nightmare on Elm Street
 Species
 Stargate
 The Texas Chainsaw Massacre

References

External links

 Avatar Press website
 Boundless Comics website
 
 
 Avatar Press at Flickr

 
Publishers of adult comics
Lists of comics by publisher
Comic book publishing companies of the United States
1996 establishments in the United States
Publishing companies established in 1996
Companies based in Champaign County, Illinois